Richard Preston (born August 5, 1954) is a writer for The New Yorker and bestselling author who has written books about infectious disease, bioterrorism, redwoods and other subjects, as well as fiction.

Biography
Preston was born in Cambridge, Massachusetts. He graduated Wellesley High School in Massachusetts in 1972 and attended Pomona College in Claremont, California. He earned a Ph.D. in English from Princeton University in 1983.

His 1992 New Yorker article "Crisis in the Hot Zone" was expanded into his breakout book, The Hot Zone (1994). It is classified as a "non-fiction thriller" about ebolaviruses. He learned of Ebola through such contacts as U.S. Army researchers Drs. C.J. Peters and Nancy Jaax. His fascination began during a visit to Africa where he was an eyewitness to epidemics. The book served as the (very loose) basis of the Hollywood movie Outbreak (1995) about military machinations surrounding a fictional "Motaba virus".

Preston's novel The Cobra Event (1998), about a terrorism release of a fictional virus combining various qualities of different diseases upon New York City, alarmed even then-President Bill Clinton who, shortly after reading it, instigated a review of bio-terror threats to the U.S. The book strove to tell a fast-paced thriller narrative within the bounds of well-researched bio-terrorism possibility, and was reportedly pressed upon Clinton by a molecular biologist when he was attending a Renaissance Weekend event.

The Demon in the Freezer (2002) covers the story of the eradication of smallpox, perhaps the most destructive virus to have plagued mankind. It details the survival of the virus in research labs and bio-weapon programs of Russia and other nations, despite its eradication in the human population. The narrative continues with anthrax, a bacterial disease of cattle and humans, used in the 2001 anthrax attacks.

First Light and American Steel are non-fiction books addressing astrophysics and the steel industry. First Light centers around the history of the Hale Telescope on Palomar Mountain, and the astronomers who work there. American Steel chronicles the history of the Nucor steel company, and focuses on its newest steel plant in Indiana, whose success depends on a new steel-sheet making machine engineered in West Germany.

Preston's personal hobby of recreational tree climbing is introduced in The Wild Trees (2007). His climbing experience likely led him to write about the largest known redwoods like Lost Monarch in the Grove of Titans, or Iluvatar, described in that book along with delicate forest canopy ecosystems.

Preston's Panic in Level 4: Cannibals, Killer Viruses, and Other Journeys to the Edge of Science is a collection of essays related to his experiences researching his previous books.

In November 2009, Preston was selected by Harper-Collins and the Michael Crichton estate to complete his unfinished novel Micro after Crichton's death in November 2008. The book was released on November 22, 2011. Approximately a third of Micro was completed by Crichton. Preston completed the book according to the author's remaining outline, notes, and research.

In 2016, Preston served as the Bedell Distinguished Visiting Professor at the University of Iowa's Nonfiction Writing Program where he judged the prestigious Iowa Prize in Literary Nonfiction.

Preston resides in Hopewell, New Jersey with his wife, Michelle, and their two daughters and one son. He is also the brother of best-selling author Douglas Preston.

Minor planet 3792 Preston is named in his honor.

Bibliography

Novels 

 1997: , or Cobra's Eye
 2003: 
 2011:  Co-written with Michael Crichton; completed after Crichton's death.

Non-fiction 

Articles
 

Nature
 2007: 

Science
 2008: 

True events
 1987: 	; OCLC 16004290
 1991: 
 1994: 
 2002: 
 2019:

References

External links

 Video conversation with Preston and Carl Zimmer on Bloggingheads.tv

20th-century American novelists
21st-century American novelists
American science writers
American male novelists
The New Yorker people
The New Yorker staff writers
People from Hopewell, New Jersey
Pomona College alumni
1954 births
Living people
20th-century American male writers
21st-century American male writers
Wellesley High School alumni
20th-century American non-fiction writers
21st-century American non-fiction writers
American male non-fiction writers